Doubles is a 2000 Indian Tamil-language drama film written and directed by Pandiarajan, who also played a guest appearance in the film. Produced by K. Rajan, the film stars Prabhu Deva, Meena, and Sangeetha, while Vivek, Manivannan, and Kovai Sarala play supporting roles. The film's score and soundtrack are composed by debutant Srikanth Deva. The film was released on 11 August 2000.

Plot
The movie starts projecting Prabhu as a shopkeeper who sells toys to kids. He does all possible crazy actions in the world, which really irritates everyone. He has many bad habits, such as drinking and smoking. Prabhu marries Meena, but she wants her husband to be like Sree Ram. Prabhu acts as if he is a nice guy and also gets caught a few times when he tries to overact. Sangeetha, Meena's close friend, comes and stays with Meena as she is doing her final year in Madras Medical College. Prabhu had earlier pinched Sangeetha's hip when she was travelling on a bus. He gets slapped by Sangeetha and was thrown from that bus before she meets him. Sangeetha takes the task of seducing Prabhu to prove that he is a womaniser to Meena and fails in many attempts. The film ends as Meena dies of jaundice and Prabhu realising that his true love was only for Meena. Sangeetha marries Ganesh, who comes for one scene in the ending.

Cast

Prabhu Deva as Prabhu
Meena as Meena
Sangeetha as Sangeetha
Manivannan as Meena's father
Vivek as Vivek
Prabhukanth as Rapist
Ishari K. Ganesh as Ramki
Shanmugasundaram as Sangeetha's father
S. Rajasekar as Doctor
Kovai Sarala as Meena's mother
Laxmi Rattan as Doctor
Yuvan Swang as Hotel worker
Amirthalingam as Devotee
Sharmili as Prostitute
Roshini as Sangeetha's friend
T. N. Raju as Aarthi, Prabhu's friend
Rama Rao as Prabhu's friend
Johnny as Prabhu's friend
Sridhar as Prabhu's friend
Japan Kumar as Prabhu's friend
Master Udayaraj as Vivek's son
Shathiga as Vivek's daughter
Deepa as Woman taking shower (uncredited role)
Lekhasri in a special appearance
K. Rajan in a cameo appearance
Pandiarajan as Ganapathy (cameo appearance)

Soundtrack
The soundtrack was composed by Srikanth Deva, son of music composer Deva, who made his debut as composer with this film. "Adi Kadhal Oru Kannil" was a chartbuster. All lyrics were written by Vairamuthu.

References

External links

2000 films
2000s Tamil-language films
Films scored by Srikanth Deva